The 1988 Suntory Japan Open Tennis Championships was a tennis tournament played on outdoor hard courts at the Ariake Coliseum in Tokyo in Japan that was part of the 1988 Nabisco Grand Prix and of the Category 2 tier of the 1988 WTA Tour. The tournament ran from 11 April through 17 April 1988. John McEnroe and Patty Fendick won the singles titles.

Finals

Men's singles
 John McEnroe defeated  Stefan Edberg 6–2, 6–2
 It was McEnroe's 1st title of the year and the 135th of his career.

Women's singles

 Patty Fendick defeated  Stephanie Rehe 6–3, 7–5
 It was Fendick's 4th title of the year and the 4th of her career.

Men's doubles
 John Fitzgerald /  Johan Kriek defeated  Steve Denton /  David Pate 6–4, 6–7, 6–4
 It was Fitzgerald's 3rd title of the year and the 20th of his career. It was Kriek's 2nd title of the year and the 22nd of his career.

Women's doubles

 Gigi Fernández /  Robin White defeated  Lea Antonoplis /  Barbara Gerken 6–1, 6–4
 It was Fernández's 1st title of the year and the 9th of her career. It was White's 1st title of the year and the 7th of her career.

References

External links
 Official website
  Association of Tennis Professionals (ATP) tournament profile

Suntory Japan Open Tennis Championships
Suntory Japan Open Tennis Championships
Japan Open (tennis)
Suntory Japan Open Tennis Championships
Suntory Japan Open Tennis Championships